Battle of Mosul may refer to:
 Battle of Mosul (1107), a battle in which Kilij Arslan I of the Rum Seljuks conquered Mosul
 Siege of Mosul (1743), an offensive in which the Persians besieged the Ottomans
 Battle of Mosul (1745), a battle between Persian and Ottoman forces, following the 1743 Siege of Mosul
 Battle of Mosul (2004), a battle fought during the Iraq War
 Battle of Mosul (2008), part of the Nineveh campaign of the Iraq War
 Fall of Mosul, a battle in June 2014 during which ISIL seized control of the city
 Mosul offensive (2015), an offensive to retake the northern outskirts of the city from ISIL in 2015
 Mosul offensive (2016), an offensive to retake the city from ISIL in 2016
 Battle of Mosul (2016–17), a battle that began on October 16, 2016, to retake Mosul from ISIL
 2017 Western Nineveh offensive, an offensive that began on 25 April 2017 and ended on 9 June 2017, to expel the forces of the Islamic State near the Syrian border
 Mosul liberation, the events leading up to the liberation of Mosul from ISIL control on 21 July 2017, and the subsequent efforts to purge the remaining militants and reconstruct the city

See also 
 Battle of Nineveh (disambiguation)